Cardiorenal syndrome (CRS) is an umbrella term used in the medical field that defines disorders of the heart and kidneys whereby "acute or chronic dysfunction in one organ may induce acute or chronic dysfunction of the other". The kidney and the heart are compared to a marriage that has "bumps" in the road, some may even say it can come to an end. The heart and kidney play vital functions that contribute to the wellbeing of the body in a healthy person. When one of these organs fail, the other subsequently fails as well, like a domino affect. The heart and the kidneys are involved in maintaining hemodynamic stability and organ perfusion through an intricate network. Patients who have renal failure first may be hard to determine if heart failure is concurrent. These two organs communicate with one another through a variety of pathways in an interdependent relationship. In a 2004 report from National Heart, Lung and Blood Institute, CRS was defined as a condition where treatment of congestive heart failure is limited by decline in kidney function. This definition has since been challenged repeatedly but there still remains little consensus over a universally accepted definition for CRS. At a consensus conference of the Acute Dialysis Quality Initiative (ADQI), the CRS was classified into five subtypes primarily based upon the organ that initiated the insult as well as the acuity of disease.

Signs and symptoms

Risk factors
The following risk factors have been associated with increased incidence of CRS.
 Older age
 Comorbid conditions (diabetes mellitus, uncontrolled hypertension, anemia)
 Drugs (anti-inflammatory agents, diuretics, ACE inhibitors, ARBs)
 History of heart failure with impaired left ventricular ejection fraction
 Prior myocardial infarction
 Elevated New York Heart Association (NYHA) functional class
 Elevated cardiac troponins
 Chronic kidney disease (reduced eGFR, elevated BUN, creatinine, or cystatin)

Pathophysiology
The pathophysiology of CRS can be attributed to two broad categories of "hemodynamic factors" such as low cardiac output, elevation of both intra-abdominal and central venous pressures, and non-hemodynamic factors or "cardiorenal connectors" such as neurohormonal and inflammatory activation. It was previously believed that low cardiac output in heart failure patients results in decreased blood flow to the kidneys which can lead to progressive deterioration of kidney function. As a result, diuresis of these patients will result in hypovolemia and pre-renal azotemia. However, several studies did not find an association between kidney dysfunction and cardiac output or other hemodynamic parameters. In addition, CRS has been observed in patients with diastolic dysfunction who have normal left ventricular systolic function. Therefore, there must be additional mechanisms involved in the progression of CRS. Elevated intra-abdominal pressures resulting from ascites and abdominal wall edema may be associated with worsening kidney functions in heart failure patients. Several studies have shown that as a result of this increased intra-abdominal pressure there is increased central venous pressure and congestion of the kidneys' veins, which can lead to worsening kidney function. In addition, many neurohormonal and inflammatory agents are implicated in the progression of CRS. These include increased formation of reactive oxygen species, endothelin, arginine vasopressin, and excessive sympathetic activity which can result in myocardial hypertrophy and necrosis. Other cardiorenal connectors include renin-angiotensin-system activation, nitric oxide/reactive oxygen species imbalance, inflammatory factors and abnormal activation of the sympathetic nervous system, which can cause structural and functional abnormalities in both heart and/or the kidney. There is a close interaction within these cardiorenal connectors as well as between these factors and the hemodynamic factors which makes the study of CRS pathophysiology complicated.

Diagnosis
It is critical to diagnose CRS at an early stage in order to achieve optimal therapeutic efficacy. However, unlike markers of heart damage or stress such as troponin, creatine kinase, natriuretic peptides, reliable markers for acute kidney injury are lacking. Recently, research has found several biomarkers that can be used for early detection of acute kidney injury before serious loss of organ function may occur. Several of these biomarkers include neutrophil gelatinase-associated lipocalin (NGAL), N-acetyl-B-D-glucosaminidase (NAG), Cystatin C, and kidney injury molecule-1 (KIM-1) which have been shown to be involved in tubular damage. Other biomarkers that have been shown to be useful include BNP, IL-18, and fatty acid binding protein (FABP). However, there is great variability in the measurement of these biomarkers and their use in diagnosing CRS must be assessed.

Classification
Ronco et al. first proposed a five-part classification system for CRS in 2008 which was also accepted at ADQI consensus conference in 2010. These include:

The distinction between CRS type 2 and CRS type 4 is based on the assumption that, also in advanced and chronic disease, two different pathophysiological mechanisms can be distinguished, whereas both CKD and HF often develop due to a common pathophysiological background, most notably hypertension and diabetes mellitus. Furthermore, the feasibility of the distinction between CRS type 2 and 4 in terms of diagnosis can be questioned.

Braam et al. argue that classifying the CRS based on the order in which the organs are affected and the timeframe (acute vs chronic) is too simplistic and without a mechanistic classification it is difficult to study CRS. They view the cardiorenal syndrome in a more holistic, integrative manner. They defined the cardiorenal syndrome as a pathophysiological condition in which combined heart and kidney dysfunction amplifies progression of failure of the individual organ, by inducing similar pathophysiological mechanisms. Therefore, regardless of which organ fails first, the same neurohormonal systems are activated causing accelerated cardiovascular disease, and progression of damage and failure of both organs. These systems are broken down into two broad categories of "hemodynamic factors" and non-hemodynamic factors or "cardiorenal connectors".

Management
Medical management of patients with CRS is often challenging as focus on treatment of one organ may have worsening outcome on the other. It is known that many of the medications used to treat HF may worsen kidney function. "As the population ages and the burden of renal disease and cardiovascular disease continue to rise, efforts to better understand the complicated relationship between these two organ systems are greatly needed." In addition, many trials on HF excluded patients with advanced kidney dysfunction. Therefore, our understanding of CRS management is still limited to this date. One study shows how ACE inhibitors and angiotensin II receptor antagonists have been found to prevent nephropathy in patients who have diabetes. Patients with kidney failure are less likely to get all guideline-based therapies. Patients who have moderate to severe CKD was seen to have similar care when compared to those patients who had normal kidney function. This helps show how healthcare workers can do more to increase the outcome of those suffering.

Diuretics Used in the treatment of heart failure and CRS patients, however must be carefully dosed to prevent kidney injury. Diuretic resistance is frequently a challenge for physicians to overcome which they may tackle by changing the dosage, frequency, or adding a second drug.

ACEI, ARB, renin inhibitors, aldosterone inhibitors The use of ACE inhibitors have long term protective effect on kidney and heart tissue. However, they should be used with caution in patients with CRS and kidney failure. Although patients with kidney failure may experience slight deterioration of kidney function in the short term, the use of ACE inhibitors is shown to have prognostic benefit over the long term. Two studies have suggested that the use of ACEI alongside statins might be an effective regimen to prevent a substantial number of CRS cases in high risk patients and improve survival and quality of life in these people. There are data suggesting combined use of statin and an ACEI improves clinical outcome more than a statin alone and considerably more than ACE inhibitor alone.

Natriuretic peptides Nesiritide which is an analogue of brain natriuretic peptide (BNP) was shown to result in poorer kidney outcome or have no effect.

Vasopressin antagonists Tolvaptan showed to have no benefit. It is also a very costly drug.

Adenosine antagonists Adenosine is responsible for constriction of afferent arteriole and reduction in GFR. It was found that an adenosine A1-receptor antagonist called KW-3902 was able to improve kidney function in CRS patients.

Ultrafiltration Many case reports have shown improved kidney function with ultrafiltration.

Inotropes Their roles remain unknown.

Epidemiology
Kidney failure is very common in patients with congestive heart failure. It was shown that kidney failure complicates one-third of all admissions for heart failure, which is the leading cause of hospitalization in the United States among adults over 65 years old.  Not only is this the leading cause of hospitalization, it also increases the stays in the ICU. These complications led to longer hospital stay, higher mortality, and greater chance for readmission. The impatient mortality was seen to be much higher for patients with much more sever renal dysfunction. The increase of hospital and ICU stays also increases the cost of care in the hospital. Not only are there patients suffering from their disease, they are also suffering financially due to the cost of the hospital stays. Another study found that 39% of patients in NYHA class 4 and 31% of patients in NYHA class 3 had severely impaired kidney function. Similarly, kidney failure can have deleterious effects on cardiovascular function. It was estimated that about 44% of deaths in patients with end-stage kidney failure (ESKF) are due to cardiovascular disease.

References

External links 

Kidney diseases
Heart diseases
Organ failure
Syndromes affecting the heart
Syndromes affecting the kidneys